Motorcycle Classics is a motorcycling magazine in the United States. They are a motorcycle magazine publication specializing in classic motorcycles 25 years old and beyond.

References

External links

2005 establishments in Kansas
Motorcycle magazines published in the United States
Monthly magazines published in the United States
Magazines established in 2005
Magazines published in Kansas
Mass media in Topeka, Kansas